Gilles Epié is a French chef. He was the youngest chef to receive a Michelin Star, at the age of 22. He was the owner and Executive Chef of Citrus Etoile restaurant in Paris near the Champs-Elysées which he operated with his wife Elizabeth from 2005 to 2017. Currently, he is the Executive Chef of L'Avant-Garde, a modern French brasserie in Georgetown, Washington, D.C.

Career
Born in Nantes, Gilles Epié started working at the age of 14 and trained with Alain Senderens and Alain Ducasse at Lucas-Carton in Paris. He received his first Michelin Star in 1980 at Le Pavillon des Princes, the youngest chef to receive the award at age 22.

He worked as a chef at several French restaurants, including La Vieille Fontaine near Paris where he received a Michelin Star in 1983, his restaurant Le Miravile, where he was honored with a Michelin Star in 1986, and La Petite Cour in Saint-Germain-des-Pres, Paris. In 1995, he left France to explore U.S. cuisine. He worked as Head Chef of the French restaurant L'Orangerie, Los Angeles, where he introduced a Provençal-inspired style of cooking. Within a year he was voted Best Chef In America of 1996 by Food & Wine Magazine. He took the restaurant from empty tables to being booked months in advance, and brought the establishment from a three-star to a five-star restaurant within six months.

Next, he bought and operated the Beverly Hills restaurant Chez Gilles along with partner Jean Denoyer.

His clients have included actors, supermodels and politicians across the world. He has prepared dinners for U.S. presidents George Bush, Bill Clinton, Ronald Reagan, Gerald Ford, and Donald Trump. He has also cooked for French Presidents François Mitterrand, Jacques Chirac, Nicolas Sarkozy, Francois Holland and Emmanuel Macron, as well as the King of Sweden, Sheikh of Qatar, Frank Sinatra, Kirk Douglas, Bruce Springsteen, Slash, Al Pacino, Harvey Keitel, Robert De Niro, Chris Tucker, Mick Jagger, Sharon Stone, Michel Polnareff, Gregory Peck, Richard Gere, Pierce Brosnan, Jennifer Lopez, Beyonce, Sophia Loren, Elizabeth Taylor, Princess Diana, Joan Severance, Zlatan Ibrahimović, Michael Jordan and many more.

After 10 years in the United States, Epié returned to Paris after a location opened up near the Champs-Elysées. He opened Citrus Etoile restaurant in 2005 along with his wife. He named the restaurant in honor of his friend Chef Michel Richard and his Los Angeles restaurant, Citrus. To celebrate its launch, the French news magazine Paris Match featured Gilles and his wife in a spread having a black-tie picnic on the wing of an American Airlines Boeing jet. Citrus Etoile was selected as a member of the Châteaux & Hotels Collection - Tables remarquables. Citrus Etoile was included in Alain Ducasse's book, J’Aime Paris.  After 13 years, Epié sold Citrus Etoile and returned to America.

Epié was the French food correspondent for the BBC from 2010 to 2016. In February 2012, he traveled with 4 other Michelin star chefs on the MSC Splendida's Celebrity Chef cruises. In 2012, he was invited to participate in the 25th anniversary celebration of Alain Ducasse's Louis XV restaurant held in Monte Carlo.

In April 2013, Epié opened Frenchy's, a Parisian style brasserie in the Charles de Gaulle Airport's International Terminal 2.

In 2015, he was the Guest Chef at La Clef des Champs restaurant in Mauritius for a French Gastronomic Week event.

In November 2016, Epié teamed up with Chef Juan Jose Cuevas for the Guest Chef Dinner Series at the Vanderbilt Hotel, a culinary event that took place in Puerto Rico. They presented a collaborative seven-course gastronomic menu. In 2016, Chef Epié was featured at the James Beard Celebrity Chef Tour Dinner in Santa Barbara and also received FestForum's Lifetime Achievement award.

In 2017, along with other chefs, Epié cooked at the second edition of the Cuisine of the Sun culinary festival, at Villa La Estancia Beach Resort & Spa in Mexico. He also  prepared a gastronomic dinner at the IBEROSTAR Grand Paraíso Hotel in Cancun.

After deciding to return to the U.S., he sold Citrus Etoile in 2017.  He became the Corporate Executive Chef at Juvia, Miami Beach in 2018. He participated in the James Beard Foundation's "Beach Chic" charity event in New York City in 2018.

In February 2019, Epié was invited as a Guest Chef at The Food Network & Cooking Channel South Beach Wine & Food Festival (SOBEWFF®).

In 2019, he became the Culinary Director/Executive Chef of the Montage Beverly Hills Hotel. The restaurant was renamed Gilles@Montage Hotel and featured French-Californian cuisine.

Style of cooking
Epié creates modern French dishes with American and international influences. California has influenced Epié's cooking style and he is praised by weight-conscious food enthusiasts. He has also added Asian and Peruvian dishes to his culinary repertoire. He is known for creating dishes with rich, bold flavors. His cuisine is constantly evolving.

He believes in using good quality locally-sourced seasonal ingredients.

Television

On television, Epié and his wife starred in two seasons of his reality documentary show in France for Canal+/Cuisine+, Dans La Vraie Vie D’un Grand Chef (In the Real Life of a Top Chef) that featured his restaurant Citrus Etoile.
He also starred in 20 episodes (2 seasons) of Un Frenchy en cuisine (A Frenchy in the Kitchen) which aired on Cuisine+ in 2015.

Epié has made numerous television appearances, including: NBC News Miami (2018), KTLA Channel 5 - California Cooking with Jessica Holmes (2019),  KTLA Channel 5 (2019).

References

External links

French chefs
Living people
Businesspeople from Nantes
Year of birth missing (living people)